The Men's team sprint took place on 25 February 2009. Team sprint qualifying at 11:00 CET and finals at 13:00 CET. The defending world champions were Italy's Renato Pasini and Cristian Zorzi.

Results 
Q – Qualified for final round due to placing in heat
q – Qualified for final round due to times
PF – Placing decided by Photo finish

Semifinals 
Qualification: First 3 in each heat (Q) and the next 6 fastest (q) advance to the final.

Semifinal 1

Semifinal 2

Final

References

External links
Final results

FIS Nordic World Ski Championships 2009